Nura, until 2017 "Kievka", is a village in Karaganda Region, Kazakhstan. It is the administrative center of the Nura District (KATO code - 355230100). The settlement was established in 1898 and since 1928 it has been the district center. Population:

Geography
Nura is located by the Ulken Kundyzdy river, close to its confluence with the Nura.

References

Populated places in Karaganda Region